Karim Benkouar (born 25 November 1979) is a Moroccan former footballer. He competed in the men's tournament at the 2000 Summer Olympics.

References

External links
 
 

1979 births
Living people
Moroccan footballers
Morocco international footballers
Olympic footballers of Morocco
Footballers at the 2000 Summer Olympics
Place of birth missing (living people)
Association football forwards
Nîmes Olympique players
Panionios F.C. players
S.C. Espinho players
AC Arlésien players
Moroccan expatriate footballers
Expatriate footballers in France
Expatriate footballers in Greece
Expatriate footballers in Portugal